Sweetheart of the Fleet is a 1942 American comedy film directed by Charles Barton and written by Albert Duffy, Maurice Tombragel and Ned Dandy. The film stars Joan Davis, Jinx Falkenburg, Joan Woodbury, Blanche Stewart, Elvia Allman and William Wright. The film was released on May 21, 1942, by Columbia Pictures.

Plot

Cast          
Joan Davis as Phoebe Weyms
Jinx Falkenburg as	Jerry Gilbert
Joan Woodbury as Kitty Leslie
Blanche Stewart as Brenda 
Elvia Allman as Cobina 
William Wright as Lt. Philip Blaine
Robert Kellard as Ensign George 'Tip' Landers 
Tim Ryan as Gordon Crouse
George McKay as Hambone Skelly
Walter Sande as Daffy Dill
Dick Elliott as Chumley
Charles Trowbridge as Commander Hawes
Tom Seidel as Bugsy
Irving Bacon as Standish
Lloyd Bridges as Sailor
Stanley Brown as Callboy
Boyd Davis as Mayor

References

External links
 

1942 films
1940s English-language films
American comedy films
1942 comedy films
Columbia Pictures films
Films directed by Charles Barton
American black-and-white films
1940s American films